Tri Protoka is a rural locality (a selo) and the administrative center of Tryokhprotoksky Selsoviet, Privolzhsky District, Astrakhan Oblast, Russia. The population was 2,569 as of 2010. There are 113 streets.

Geography 
Tri Protoka is located 9 km west of Nachalovo (the district's administrative centre) by road. Polyana is the nearest rural locality.

References 

Rural localities in Privolzhsky District, Astrakhan Oblast